Kim Động is a rural district of Hưng Yên province in the Red River Delta region of Vietnam. As of 2003 the district had a population of 123,443. The district covers an area of 115 km². The district capital lies at Lương Bằng.

References

Districts of Hưng Yên province